The Embassy of the Philippines in Tel Aviv is the diplomatic mission of the Republic of the Philippines to the State of Israel.  Opened in 1962, it is located on 18 Bnei Dan Street in the Yehuda HaMaccabi neighborhood of central Tel Aviv, across from Yarkon Park.

History
The Philippine Embassy in Tel Aviv was opened in 1962, five years after the establishment of diplomatic relations between the Philippines and Israel. Its opening coincided with the that of the Israeli Embassy in Manila that same year.

In 2012, the Embassy's website was hacked by a hacker who identified himself as "RcP" amid increased tension between Israeli troops and Hamas in the Gaza Strip.

Proposed relocation to Jerusalem
In December 2017, the Israeli Ministry of Foreign Affairs claimed that the Philippines was one of at least ten countries reportedly looking to relocate its embassy from Tel Aviv to Jerusalem, following the decision of the United States to do so earlier in the month. The Department of Foreign Affairs (DFA) denied that such a move was being discussed, citing its support for a two-state solution as part of the wider Israeli–Palestinian peace process.

DFA Undersecretary Ernesto Abella again denied in August 2018 that the Philippine government was considering moving the embassy to Jerusalem when he mentioned that it was not a part of President Rodrigo Duterte's agenda for his then-upcoming state visit to Israel.

Staff and activities
The Philippine Embassy in Tel Aviv is headed by Ambassador Pedro R. Laylo Jr., who was appointed by President Bongbong Marcos on July 18, 2022. Prior to becoming Ambassador, Laylo, a pollster, founded the polling firm Laylo Research Strategies, regarded for the quality of its opinion polls, and previously sat on the board of the Bases Conversion and Development Authority. His appointment was confirmed by the Commission on Appointments on September 28, 2022, and he presented his credentials to Israeli President Isaac Herzog on January 11, 2023.

The Embassy's activities center around providing to the welfare of Filipinos in Israel, many of whom are Overseas Filipino Workers (OFWs). Following the death of a Filipino worker from a bomb explosion in Haifa in 2001, the Embassy organized text brigades to quickly disseminate information to Filipinos throughout the country, while in 2005, Ambassador Antonio Modena protested the treatment of Filipinos entering or exiting Israel, many of whom were subjected to excess security screening or were segregated from other departing or arriving foreigners.

In addition to catering to the welfare of Filipinos in Israel, the Philippine Embassy in Tel Aviv also provides assistance to nationals of member countries of the Association of Southeast Asian Nations (ASEAN) which do not have a diplomatic presence in Israel, such as with the case of 12 Malaysians detained by Israeli authorities following the Gaza flotilla raid in 2010.

See also
Israel–Philippines relations
Filipinos in Israel
List of diplomatic missions of the Philippines
Embassy of Israel, Manila

References

External links
Official website of the Philippine Embassy in Tel Aviv
Former website

Philippines
Tel Aviv
Israel–Philippines relations